Oskar Lenz (13 April 1848 in Leipzig – 1 March 1925 in Sooß) was a German-Austrian geologist and mineralogist born in Leipzig.

In 1870, he earned his doctorate in mineralogy and geology at the University of Leipzig. In 1872, he joined as a volunteer at the Imperial Geological Reichsanstalt in Vienna. Later that same year he obtained Austrian citizenship.

In 1879-80, he led the first trans-Sahara expedition from Morocco to Senegal. The primary purpose of the expedition was to perform geological studies of the region, investigating the possibilities of iron ore deposits. In 1880, with his Spaniard companion Cristobal Benítez, he became only the fourth European to visit the fabled city of Timbuktu. The others being, Alexander Gordon Laing (1826), René Caillié (1828) and Heinrich Barth (1853).

In 1885-87, he directed the Austro-Hungarian Congo Expedition, a mission that involved crossing the African continent from the Congo eastward to the Indian Ocean. The main reasons of the project were to survey the economic trade situation in the newly established Congo Free State and to map the Congo-Nile watershed between the Nile and Congo Rivers. On the expedition, he was accompanied by cartographer Oskar Baumann (up until succumbing to illness on the mission) and ornithologist Friedrich Bohndorff. Following the completion of his duties in Africa, he became a professor at the University of Prague (June 1887).

Selected publications 
 Ueber das Auftreten Jurassischer Gebilde in Böhmen, (On the occurrence of Jurassic build-up in Bohemia), (1870).
 Skizzen aus Westafrika (Sketches of West Africa), (1878).
  Volume 1,  Volume 2. Translated into French in 1886 by Pierre Lehautcourt.
 Gallica: Volume 1, Volume 2.
 Geologische Karte von West-Afrika, (Geological chart of West Africa), (1882).
 Wanderungen in Afrika (Travels in Africa), (1895).
 Ophir und die ruinen von Zimbabye in Südostafrika, Prag, Verlag Des Vereins (Ophir and the ruins of Zimbabwe in southeastern Africa), (1896).

References 
 "This article is based on a translation of an equivalent article at the German Wikipedia"; which includes: Lenz Oskar In: Österreichisches Biographisches Lexikon 1815–1950 (ÖBL). Band 5, Verlag der Österreichischen Akademie der Wissenschaften, Wien 1972, S. 140.
 Literature of Travel and Exploration, ed. Jennifer Speake

External links
 

19th-century German geologists
German mineralogists
German explorers
German explorers of Africa
20th-century Austrian geologists
Austrian mineralogists
Austrian explorers
Scientists from Leipzig
Academic staff of Charles University
1848 births
1925 deaths
Explorers of Africa